Caruna distributes electricity and maintains, repairs and builds a weatherproof electricity network for its 690,000 customers in South, Southwest and West Finland, as well as in the city of Joensuu, the sub-region of Koillismaa and Satakunta. Caruna is responsible for about a fifth of Finland's electricity distribution. The CEO is Tomi Yli-Kyyny.

Organization
Caruna includes two separate network companies. Caruna Espoo Oy operates in urban areas with a high cabling rate and a high number of customers to share the expenses per metres of network. Caruna Oy operates mainly in rural, sparsely populated, areas where their amount of network to be maintained, built and repaired is high. The length of the network is 168 metres per customer in Caruna Oy's area. In Caruna Espoo Oy's area, the corresponding number is 36 metres per customer.

Caruna was founded in 2014, but its story really began in 1912 in a place called Karuna where a new electricity company started out. Caruna has approximately 300 employees and contracts 1,000 additional workers across Finland. Caruna's operations are regulated by the Finnish Energy Authority, in charge of monitoring the electricity network business in Finland.

Caruna is owned by Finnish employment pension companies Elo (7.5%) and Keva (12.5%), as well as international infrastructure investors OMERS Infrastructure (40%) and First State Investments (40%).

Electricity network 

The cabling rate is 56 per cent of the network. In 2019, the company distributed electricity to its customers with a reliability rate of 99.99 per cent. The newest substation is in Suurpelto, Espoo and it takes care of the electricity supply for the 20,00 customers in the area.

Turnover 
In 2019 the net sales amounted to EUR 466 million. Caruna paid a total of EUR 12.2 million in corporation tax in 2019. Caruna invested 167.3 million on building a reliable, weatherproof electricity network.

In 2017 Caruna turnover was €145 million and state tax rate 4% (€6 million). In 2017 Caruna paid its stakeholders  8.17% interest (77 million) while market loans were 1.5–3 % interest. Company interest cost were reduced from the taxable income based on Sipilä Cabinet taxation rules.

References

Electric power distribution network operators in Finland
OMERS companies